Coleophora juncivora is a moth of the family Coleophoridae. It is found on Honshu island of Japan.

The larvae feed on the seeds of Juncus krameri and Juncus leschenaultii. They create a slender, tubular case with a trilobed anal end.

References

juncivora
Moths described in 1990
Moths of Japan